La casta. Così i politici italiani sono diventati intoccabili (The Caste. How Italian politicians became untouchable) is an Italian book, written by Sergio Rizzo and Gian Antonio Stella, two journalists from the Italian national newspaper Corriere della Sera, detailing the amount of graft and corruption in Italian politics. It was published in 2007, and became a bestseller.

References

2007 books
Italian books